List of Guggenheim Fellowships awarded in 2018: Guggenheim Fellowships have been awarded annually since 1925, by the John Simon Guggenheim Memorial Foundation to those "who have demonstrated exceptional capacity for productive scholarship or exceptional creative ability in the arts." The John Simon Guggenheim Memorial Foundation approved the awarding of 173 Guggenheim Fellowships, including two joint Fellowships, chosen from a group of almost 3,000 applicants in the Foundation’s ninety-fourth competition.

See also
 Guggenheim Fellowship
 List of Guggenheim Fellowships awarded in 2017
 List of Guggenheim Fellowships awarded in 2019

References

2018
2018 awards
2018 art awards